Söhbətli (also, Seybatli and Sokhbetli) is a village and municipality in the Shabran District of Azerbaijan.  It has a population of 355.

References

External links 

Populated places in Shabran District